The 2015 Mississippi Attorney General election was held on November 3, 2015, to elect the Attorney General of Mississippi. Incumbent Democratic Attorney General Jim Hood, who had been the only statewide elected Democrat in Mississippi since 2008, sought and won reelection to a fourth term.

Primaries

Democratic nomination

Candidate
Jim Hood, incumbent

Republican primary

Candidate
Mike Hurst, Assistant U.S. Attorney

Results

General election

Results

County results

Notes

Attorney General
Mississippi
Mississippi Attorney General elections